The Defence Forces' Medal for Meritorious Service was a medal awarded by the Republic of Rhodesia.

History 
The Defence Forces' Medal for Meritorious Service was a medal awarded for Meritorious service to the Rhodesian Defence Forces.

Description 
A silver, 36mm circular medal carrying on the obverse the national armorial bearings. The reverse carries the lion and tusk and eagle emblems of the Combined Services, surrounded by a wreath of flame lilies, This is surrounded by the words "For Meritorious Service". 
The name of the recipient is etched on the rim of the medal.

References 

Military awards and decorations of Rhodesia